This is a list of schools in the Roman Catholic Diocese of Dallas.

PK-12 schools
 Notre Dame School of Dallas (Special Education)
 The Highlands School (non-diocesan)

5-12 schools
 Cistercian Preparatory School (Irving) - Boys only, non-diocesan

High schools
 Bishop Dunne Catholic School, Dallas
 Bishop Lynch High School, Dallas
John Paul II High School, Plano
 Non Diocesan Catholic schools
 Cristo Rey Dallas College Prep
 Jesuit College Preparatory School of Dallas
 Ursuline Academy

Grade schools
 All Saints Catholic School (Dallas)
 Bishop Dunne Catholic School (Dallas)
 Christ the King Catholic School (Dallas)
 James L. Collins Catholic School (Corsicana)
 Good Shepherd Catholic School (Garland)
 Holy Family Catholic Academy (Irving)
 Holy Trinity Catholic School (Dallas)
 Immaculate Conception Catholic School (Grand Prairie)
 Mary Immaculate Catholic School (Farmers Branch)
 Mount St. Michael Catholic School (Dallas)
 Our Lady of Perpetual Help School (Dallas)
 Prince of Peace Catholic School (Plano)
 Santa Clara of Assisi Catholic School (Dallas)
 St. Bernard Catholic School (Dallas)
 St. Cecilia Catholic School (Dallas)
 St. Elizabeth of Hungary Catholic School (Dallas)
 St. Joseph Catholic School (Richardson)
 St. Joseph Catholic School (Waxahachie)
 St. Mark Catholic School (Plano)
 St. Mary Catholic School (Sherman)
 St. Mary of Carmel Catholic School (Dallas)
 St. Monica Catholic School (Dallas) - The school was established on February 1, 1954. In June of that year the church paid Knowlton Construction Company $450,200 to build the school. A fundraiser campaign for a permanent school was held in November that year. Groundbreaking for temporary buildings occurred on February 21, 1955. The permanent school opened on October 24 of that year.
 St. Patrick Catholic School (Dallas)
 St. Paul the Apostle Catholic School (Richardson)
 St. Philip & St. Augustine Catholic Academy (Dallas)
 St. Pius X Catholic School (Dallas)
 St. Rita Catholic School (Dallas) - The school opened in 1964, and after that the building was added on to seven times.
 St. Thomas Aquinas Catholic School (Dallas) - It has separate facilities for grades Pre-Kindergarten through 2 (lower school) and grades 3-8 (upper school): the upper school is in Wilshire Heights, while the lower school is in Caruth Terrace. It opened as Sacred Heart School #2 in 1947. The Monsignor John T. Gulczynski Early Childhood Center, previously the First Community Church, was acquired by St. Thomas Aquinas in 2005.  the lower school has 351 students. Aquinas is a 2012 National Blue Ribbon School.

Preschools 
 Angel Creek Preschool (Coppell) - Within St. Ann Catholic Church
 Ark Adventure Preschool (Plano) - Within St. Elizabeth Ann Seton Catholic Church
 Caring Little Friends of St. Francis Preschool (Frisco) - Within St. Francis of Assisi Catholic Church
 Gabriel's Little Angels Preschool (McKinney) - Within St. Gabriel the Archangel Catholic Church
 Little Disciples Early Learning Program (Richardson) - Within St. Joseph Catholic Church
 Little Saints and Scholars Preschool (Wylie) - Within St. Anthony Catholic Church
 St. Pius X Early Care and Education Center (Mesquite) - Separated from the main St. Pius X School
 Sunshine and Rainbows Early Learning Center (Allen) - Within St. Jude Catholic Church

References

External links
 Schools of the Dallas Diocese

Dallas, Roman Catholic Diocese of
Education in Dallas
Schools in the Roman Catholic Diocese of Dallas